Welsh Language Act refers to two different acts of the United Kingdom Parliament:

 Welsh Language Act 1967, which extended the Welsh Courts Act 1942, restoring some rights for the official use of Welsh that had been removed in the 16th century
 Welsh Language Act 1993, which put Welsh on an equal footage to English for all public sector use

See also
 Welsh Language (Wales) Measure 2011